Operation Desecrate One was a World War II United States Navy operation on 30-31 March 1944. Desecrate One was part of the preparations for Operations Reckless and Persecution, the Allied invasion of western New Guinea.

Thirty-six Japanese ships were sunk or damaged in the attacks. Among these ships were significant auxiliary vessels such as the torpedo boat tender Kamikaze Maru, submarine tender Urakami Maru, aircraft transport Goshu Maru, repair ship Akashi and the tankers Iro, Ose, and Sata. In addition, TBF and TBM Avengers from the carriers laid extensive fields of mines in and around the channels and approaches to the Palau Islands in the first tactical use during the Pacific War of mines laid by carrier aircraft.

Gallery

References 

 Bangust (DE-739)

External links 
 http://www.ibiblio.org/hyperwar/USN/BBBO/BBBO-13.html

Desecrate
Desecrate
Desecrate